Melissa Linda "Mo" Martin (born October 8, 1982) is an American professional golfer playing on the LPGA Tour. Her sole win on the tour was a major championship, the Women's British Open in 2014.

College career
Martin played college golf all four years at UCLA, walking-on as a freshman. She was the Bruins' Most Valuable Player in 2002, earned UCLA academic honors, and was also a three-time Pac-10 Academic Honorable Mention selection. She graduated in 2005 with a bachelor's degree in psychology.

Professional career
Martin turned professional in 2005, and joined the Futures Tour on January 23, 2006. She played in the 2007 U.S. Women's Open and missed the cut. Martin was the 2010 recipient of the Futures Tour's Heather Wilbur Spirit Award, presented annually to the player who "best exemplifies dedication, courage, perseverance, love of the game and spirit toward achieving goals as a professional golfer." The annual recipient is nominated by her peers on the tour. In 2011, with 11 top-10 finishes and 1 victory, she earned full playing privileges on the LPGA Tour for the 2012 season.

Martin won the Women's British Open in 2014, her first major championship and also her first LPGA Tour title. She led after 36 holes, but a 77 (+5) on Saturday dropped her three strokes back. An eagle at the final hole on Sunday gave her the victory, one stroke ahead of runners-up Shanshan Feng and Suzann Pettersen. It was Martin's first eagle of the 2014 season and the win moved her from 99 to 26 in the women's world rankings. Her previous best finish in a major was a tie for 29th at the 2014 Kraft Nabisco Championship.

Personal
Born in Pasadena, California, Martin attended Chandler School. Her father, Allen Martin, was a defense attorney and taught her to play golf as a child, using Ben Hogan's Five Lessons: The Modern Fundamentals of Golf. Allen died of a heart attack when Mo was in college at age 20, and she then established a relationship with her paternal grandfather, Lincoln Martin, who was over 90 years old. Before Allen's death, Mo and Lincoln had minimal interaction, due to a strained father-son relationship. During her early years as a professional on the Futures Tour, Lincoln was her chief supporter and mentor. He died in March 2014 at age 102, about four months before she won her major title in England.

Her nickname "Mo" was given to her by her father, in reference to the U.S.S. Missouri, a famous battleship of World War II that served the U.S. Navy into the 1990s.

She currently resides in Naples, Florida.

Professional wins (4)

LPGA Tour wins (1)

Futures Tour wins (3)

Major championships

Wins (1)

Results timeline
Results not in chronological order before 2019.

^ The Evian Championship was added as a major in 2013

CUT = missed the half-way cut
"T" = tied

Summary

Most consecutive cuts made – 4 (three times)
Longest streak of top-10s – 1 (three times)

References

External links

American female golfers
UCLA Bruins women's golfers
LPGA Tour golfers
Winners of LPGA major golf championships
Golfers from California
Sportspeople from Pasadena, California
1982 births
Living people